"The One That Got Away" is the 24th episode of the second season of the American comedy television series Modern Family, and the 48th episode overall. It is the last episode of season 2. It was originally aired on May 25, 2011. The episode was directed by James Bagdonas and was written by Paul Corrigan, Brad Walsh and Dan O'Shannon.

The episode follows the family trying to create a special day for Jay's birthday, while only he wants is to spend a quiet day fishing. Claire and Mitchell try to recreate a photo of the two of them while they were kids to make a special gift to Jay, Cameron goes to bakery to buy a cake but he gets into trouble, Phil tries to pass Gloria as his wife at the mall when he runs into his college nemesis and the kids try to make a special video as a gift to Jay. Everyone gathers at the house for the birthday, but the dinner ends up a disaster.

The episode received positive reviews from critics.

Plot
It is Jay's (Ed O'Neill) birthday and all he desires is to have a quiet birthday while fishing on the lake, but the family misinterpret him as wanting a big celebration. In their frantic scramble to put everything together, all they manage to do is to ruin Jay's day who ends up not going fishing.

Claire (Julie Bowen) and Mitchell (Jesse Tyler Ferguson) want to make a special gift to their dad; recreate a photo of the two of them while they were kids. They dressed up the way they were on the photo (Mitchell is dressed up as a sailor) and they go to their childhood home to take the picture. When they get there, no one is at home so they decide to climb the fence, take the picture and go. While trying to take the picture, the dog of the owners' sees them and they wind up trapped in the back yard. They end up calling Jay to come and help them.

Meanwhile, Cameron (Eric Stonestreet) goes to the bakery to buy a cake for Jay but he gets himself into trouble when people hear him talking on the phone. Manny (Rico Rodriguez) is on the other side of the line asking for advice for a girl he likes. Cameron is telling him what to say and people misinterpret his words, thinking he is talking to an underage girl. While crying he calls Gloria (Sofía Vergara) to ask her to take the cake but Jay accidentally took her phone so he is the one who ends up going to buy the cake.

Phil (Ty Burrell) runs into his old college nemesis, Glen (Rob Huebel), while at the mall with Gloria and Lily. When Glen keeps making fun of him, he decides to make him think that Gloria is his wife. Glen gets impressed when he sees Gloria but he tells Phil that he was thinking he had married Claire and that he was jealous of him back in college because he was dating her. Phil realizes how lucky he is for having Claire and after going back home he tells her all the time.

Haley (Sarah Hyland), Alex (Ariel Winter) and Luke (Nolan Gould) want to do a special gift for their grandfather; a video with all the family talking about Jay and wishing him happy birthday. The material they have though is not the best and Luke says he will edit it to make something awesome.

At the end of the episode, the whole family is at Jay and Gloria's home for the birthday dinner. Jay's day at the lake is ruined, Stella drops the cake on the floor and the presents Jay gets are not the ones someone was expecting. Luke wants to save the day with the special video but when he plays it no one likes it and it leaves Jay with a headache. Finally, Manny is the one who saves the party who tried to make Jay's wish about fishing come true at the house's pool.

The episode ends with Mitchell telling Cameron that he wants a second kid. Cameron immediately agrees asking if they could get a boy this time.

Production

"The One That Got Away" was written by Paul Corrigan, Brad Walsh & Dan O'Shannon and was directed by James Bagdonas, his first and only credit for the series. This episode was given a rating of TV-14 L. The episode was filmed on March 9 and March 10, 2011. The episode also features a guest appearance from Rob Huebel as Glen Whipple, Phil's old college nemesis.

Reception

Ratings
In its original American broadcast on May 25, 2011, "The One That Got Away" was viewed by an estimated 10.31 million households and received a 4.2 rating/11% share among adults between the ages of 18 and 49. This means that it was seen by 4.1% of all 18- to 49-year-olds, and 11% of all 18- to 49-year-olds watching television at the time of the broadcast. This marked a slight rise in the ratings from the previous episode "See You Next Fall" and stayed flat with the first season finale, "Family Portrait". In its timeslot, "See You Next Fall" was defeated by Fox reality series, American Idol which received a 9.2 rating/26% share in the 18–49 demographic. However, the series defeated a rerun episode of CBS crime drama Criminal Minds which received a 1.4 rating/4% share, a rerun episode of the NBC reality series Minute to Win It which received a 1.0 rating/2% share and the season finale of The CW Television Network reality series America's Next Top Model which received a 0.4 rating/2% share. "The One That Got Away" was the second most-watched scripted show for the week of broadcast among adults aged 18–49 after the Glee finale, and was the seventh most-watched show among all viewers. Added with the DVR viewers, the episode received a 6.2 rating in the 18–49 demographic, adding a 2.0 rating to the original viewership.

Reviews
"The One That Got Away" received mostly positive reviews from critics.

HitFix reviewer Alan Sepinwall gave the episode a positive review, complimenting the episode for having an overlapping theme and plot, unlike previous episodes. He also complimented the writers for featuring "versions of the characters I feel the most affection for" and for using a plot for Cameron that "didn't revolve around him being a whiny, overly-sensitive diva".

Donna Bowman of The A.V. Club compared the episode to "Airport 2010" and "Hawaii" and praised the episode's use of Ed O'Neill and for his characters non "explosive" reactions to his family planning a birthday party for him. She ultimately gave the episode a B+.

Despite the positive reviews, many critics suggested that the previous episode, "See You Next Fall", would've worked better as the season finale.

Easter Eggs
At the beginning of the episode, Haley and Alex are seen watching Lily's commercial from the season 2 episode where Lily starred in a commercial (episode 7, "Chirp").

The short videos of the family members that Alex took in order to create a video montage for Jay's birthday refer each to a specific episode of the season: Haley in the black cat costume from "Halloween" (episode 6), Gloria yelling at the next door's dog from "Unplugged" (episode 5), Mitchell practicing the choreography for the flash mob he surprises Cam with in "Manny Get Your Gun" (episode 8), Phil with the Bixby's name tag for the improvised Valentine's role play in "Bixby's Back" (episode 14), Cam putting on makeup to become Fizbo because he has "a little girl's birthday party to save", meaning Lily's "Princess Party" (episode 15), Claire getting out with the "Slow down" signs she made for the driver of the too fast car from "Slow Down Your Neighbors" (episode 11) and Luke with the "astronaut helmet" he wore in "Chirp" (episode 7) to avoid catching Claire and Haley's cold, where we also see Phil in the background curse the chirping smoke detector while wearing Claire's apron.

Also, near the end, Gloria looks for cake candles in the kitchen drawer and finds various objects which have been important in previous episodes: the FrootLoop necklace Manny gave her in "Mother's Day" (episode 21), the Baby Jesus that Gloria received from Jay's secretary who misunderstood her when she told her to order "baby cheeses" in "Halloween" (episode 6), the BB gun that Manny gets from Jay for his birthday and the spare set of Gloria's car keys from "Manny Get Your Gun" (episode 8), which led her and Jay to a fight because he said she is too disorganised and lost them while she insisted until the end that somebody broke in and stole them. Yet in this episode she only comments the finding with a "Ay, I was looking for these keys".

References

External links

"The One That Got Away" at ABC.com

2011 American television episodes
Modern Family (season 2) episodes